Rebelde (English: Rebel) stylized as REBƎLDE is a Spanish-language Mexican teen drama television series directed by Santiago Limón. It's a sequel to the 2004 Mexican telenovela Rebelde which is in turn a reboot of the Argentine telenovela Rebelde Way, by Cris Morena, and is the fifth version produced worldwide. The series premiered on Netflix on 5 January 2022.

On 9 January 2022, Netflix announced the renewal of Rebelde for its second season. The second season was released on 27 July 2022.

Cast

Main
Azul Guaita as Jana Gandía Cohen, a famous teen pop star who is Sebas' girlfriend and Pilar's daughter.
 Franco Masini as Luka Colucci, a snobby teen from Argentina who is the cousin of Mia Colucci.
 Sergio Mayer Mori as Estebán Torres/Estebán Colucci, a poor talented pianist from Puebla that keeps a secret.
 Andrea Chaparro as María José Sevilla (M.J), a teen from California who’s previously only gone to all-girl schools and whose religious upbringing is tested at EWS.
 Jerónimo Cantillo as Guillermo Álvarez (Dixon), a street-smart teen from Colombia that wants to become a successful hip-hop artist.
 Lizeth Selene as Andrea Agosti (Andi), a recluse but nice teen with a strong personality that play the drums, and is in-love-with Emilia.
 Alejandro Puente as Sebastián Langarica (Sebas), a snob and calculating student at EWS, who is Jana's boyfriend.
 Giovanna Grigio as Emília Alo, an influent Brazilian student that secretly feel interested in Andi.
 Estefanía Villarreal as Director Celina Ferrer
Leonardo de Lozanne as Marcelo Colucci 
Karla Sofia Gazcón as Lourdes
Pamela Almanza as Anita (season 1)
 Flavio Medina as Gustavo Bauman (Gus) (season 2), a famous music producer with a secret plan for EWS.
 Saak as Okane (season 2), a singer who lost his fame after drug addiction.

Recurring
Alaíde as Laura Vega
Fernando Sujo as Alejandro
Karla Cossío as Pilar Gandía (recurring season 1; guest season 2)
Enrique Chi as Salvador Torres (recurring season 1; guest season 2)
Dominika Paleta as Marina de Langarica (recurring season 1; guest season 2)
Carmen Madrid as Agustina Sevilla (season 1)
Alex Lago as Kuri (season 1)
Mariané Cartas as Ilse (season 2)

Episodes

Season 1（2022）

Season 2（2022）

Production

Development 
In March 2021, production began in Mexico City. In May 2021, actor Sergio Mayer apologized to his cast mates and followers after his controversial statements in which he admitted to hating the band RBD, which came from Rebelde, the telenovela they are making a sequel to that he is a part of.

Marketing 
On 22 September 2021, Netflix revealed the first official poster. On 25 September 2021, Netflix revealed the first musical video teaser. On 9 November, the first teaser trailer was released. On 7 December, the official trailer was released.

Soundtrack 

Rebelde la Serie (Official Soundtrack) is the first soundtrack of the television series, released on 5 January 2022 by Sony Music.

References

External links 

2020s Mexican drama television series
2022 Mexican television series debuts
Boarding school fiction
Comedy telenovelas
Mexican telenovelas
Musical telenovelas
2020s teen drama television series
Spanish-language Netflix original programming
Teen telenovelas
Mexican television series based on Argentine television series
Spanish-language telenovelas
Television series about teenagers
Television series reboots
Television shows filmed in Mexico